Orbicula richenii is a species of fungus belonging to the Orbicula genus.   It was documented in 1904 by Brazilian mycologist Johannes Rick.

References 

Pezizales
Fungi described in 1904